Prosper Boulanger (November 17, 1918  December 5, 2002) was a Canadian politician and businessman. He was elected to the House of Commons of Canada in 1962 as a Member of the Liberal Party to represent the riding of Mercier. He was re-elected in 1963, 1965, 1968, 1972 and 1974. During his political career, he was Chair of the Canadian House of Commons Standing Committee on Veterans Affairs and also a member of the Canadian House of Commons Standing Committee on Fisheries and Forestry and the Canadian House of Commons Standing Committee on Procedure and Organization and served as Assistant Deputy Chair of Committees of the Whole. Boulanger was also a councillor on the Montreal City Council and also served in the Royal Canadian Air Force between 1939 and 1946.

External links
 

1918 births
2002 deaths
Liberal Party of Canada MPs
Members of the House of Commons of Canada from Quebec
People from Chaudière-Appalaches